The Definitive Rock Collection is a two-disc retrospective of the British rock group Faces released in 2007, collecting thirty tracks from among the group's four studio albums, a Rod Stewart album, single A and B-sides, and an outtake from the sessions for their last album.

The collection includes six of ten tracks from 1970's First Step (originally credited to Small Faces);  four of nine from 1971's Long Player, including the studio-recorded US-only single version of their cover of Paul McCartney's "Maybe I'm Amazed"; eight of nine from 1971's A Nod Is as Good as a Wink...To a Blind Horse; and seven of ten tracks from 1973's Ooh La La appear, along with an unreleased song from those sessions.

The liner notes are written by Sean Egan.

The Definitive Rock Collection has received a largely positive response from critics since its release.  It's the AllMusic "album pick" for compilations of the band (non- box set). Thom Jurek wrote for AllMusic that "this baby replaces the previous collection (Good Boys... When They're Asleep) in sound and content."

Track listing

Disc 1
"Wicked Messenger" (Bob Dylan) – from First Step (March 1970)
"Shake, Shudder, Shiver" (Ronnie Lane and Ron Wood) – from First Step
"Around the Plynth" (Rod Stewart and Ron Wood) – from First Step
"Flying" (Ronnie Lane, Rod Stewart and Ron Wood) – from First Step
"Pineapple and the Monkey" (Ron Wood) – from First Step
"Three Button Hand Me Down" (Ian McLagan and Rod Stewart) – from First Step
"Bad 'N' Ruin" (Ian McLagan and Rod Stewart)  –from First Step
"Sweet Lady Mary" (Ronnie Lane, Rod Stewart and Ron Wood) – from Long Player (February 1971)
"Had Me a Real Good Time" (Ronnie Lane, Rod Stewart and Ron Wood) – from Long Player
"(I Know) I'm Losing You" (Cornelius Grant, Eddie Holland, Norman Whitfield) – from Every Picture Tells A Story (May 1971)
"Maybe I'm Amazed" (Paul McCartney) – (A-side single, 1971)
"Miss Judy's Farm" (Rod Stewart and Ron Wood) – from A Nod Is as Good as a Wink...To a Blind Horse (November 1971)
"You're So Rude" (Ronnie Lane and Ian McLagan) – from A Nod Is as Good as a Wink...To a Blind Horse
"Love Lives Here" (Ronnie Lane, Rod Stewart and Ron Wood) – from A Nod Is as Good as a Wink...To a Blind Horse
"Last Orders Please" (Ronnie Lane) – from A Nod Is as Good as a Wink...To a Blind Horse

Disc 2

"Stay With Me" (Rod Stewart and Ron Wood) – from A Nod Is as Good as a Wink...To a Blind Horse
"Debris" (Ronnie Lane) – from A Nod Is as Good as a Wink...To a Blind Horse
"Memphis, Tennessee" (Chuck Berry) – from A Nod Is as Good as a Wink...To a Blind Horse
"Too Bad" (Rod Stewart and Ron Wood) – from A Nod Is as Good as a Wink...To a Blind Horse
"Silicone Grown" (Rod Stewart and Ron Wood –) from Ooh La La (March 1973)
"Cindy Incidentally" (Ian McLagan, Rod Stewart and Ron Wood) – from Ooh La La
"My Fault" (Ian McLagan, Rod Stewart and Ron Wood) – from Ooh La La
"Glad and Sorry" (Ronnie Lane) – from Ooh La La
"Borstal Boys" (Ian McLagan, Rod Stewart and Ron Wood) – from Ooh La La
"Just Another Honky" (Ronnie Lane) – from Ooh La La
"Ooh La La" (Ronnie Lane and Ron Wood) – from Ooh La La
"Jodie" (Ian McLagan, Rod Stewart and Ron Wood) – (B-side to Oh No (Not My Baby)) 
"Pool Hall Richard" (Rod Stewart and Ron Wood) – (A-side single, 1973)
"You Can Make Me Dance, Sing or Anything (Even Take the Dog for a Walk, Mend a Fuse, Fold Away the Ironing Board, or Any Other Domestic Shortcomings)" (K. Jones, Ian McLagan, Rod Stewart, Ron Wood and T. Yamauchi) – (A-side single, 1974)
"Open to Ideas" (Ian McLagan, Rod Stewart and Ron Wood) from  The Faces' Last Sessions – (January 1975)

Personnel
Kenney Jones – drums, percussion (June 1969 – December 1975)
Ronnie Lane – bass, acoustic guitar, dobro, tambourine, secondary and occasional lead vocals (June 1969 – June 1973)
Ian McLagan – organ, acoustic and electric pianos, harmonium, clavinet, backing vocals (June 1969 – December 1975)
Rod Stewart – lead vocals, banjo, rhythm guitar on "Flags and Banners" and "I Feel So Good" (July 1969 – December 1975)
Ronnie Wood – lead, acoustic, slide, and pedal steel guitars, bass, harmonica, electric bouzouki, vocals (June 1969 – December 1975)
Tetsu Yamauchi – bass (August 1973 – December 1975)
Featuring:
Harry Beckett and Bobby Keyes – horns on "Had Me A Real Good Time" and "Tonight's Number"

References

External links
 Pitchfork review: 

Faces (band) albums
2007 compilation albums
Rhino Records compilation albums